The People's Republic of China competed at the 2000 Summer Olympics in Sydney, Australia. The team excluded athletes from the Special Administrative Region of Hong Kong, after the territory's return to Chinese rule in 1997, and which competed separately as Hong Kong, China.

271 competitors, 91 men and 180 women, took part in 163 events in 28 sports. China finished for the first time in the top 3 with 28 gold medals. China also broke the record for the most gold medals won by Asian countries at a single Summer Olympics (28), which was previously set by Japan in 1964 (16) and by China in 1992 (16) and 1996 (16).

Medalists

Results by event
Unless otherwise indicated, all results are derived from the Official Report of the XXVII Olympiad.

Archery

Defending silver medalist He Ying was defeated by one of the Korean women in the round of 16.

Individual events

Teams

Athletics

Men's track

Men's field

Women's track

Women's field

Badminton

Men

Singles

Doubles

Women

Singles

Doubles

Mixed doubles

Basketball

Men's
Team roster
Guo Shiqiang
Hu Weidong
Li Nan
Li Qun
Li Xiaoyong
Liu Yudong
Mengke Bateer
Sun Jun
Wang Zhizhi
Yao Ming
Zhang Jingsong
Zheng Wu

Results
Group A Summary

Preliminary round

9/10th classification match

Beach volleyball

Boxing

Cycling

Road
Cross-country

Track
Sprint

Time trial

Diving

China won ten medals at the diving competition  — five gold medals and five silver medals. Fu Mingxia, who had retired after the 1996 Olympics, came back to win a gold and silver medal and became the first woman to win five Olympic medals.

Men

Women

Fencing

Thirteen fencers, six men and seven women, represented China in 2000.
Men

Women

Football

The Chinese women's team finished fifth overall in the competition.

Women's tournament
Team roster

Bai Jie
Fan Yunjie
Gao Hong
Jin Yan
Liu Ailing
Liu Ying
Pu Wei
Sun Wen – Top scorer (4 goals)
Wang Liping
Wen Lirong
Xie Huilin
Zhang Ouying
Zhao Lihong

Group stage

Gymnastics

Men's artistic
Team

Individual events

Women's artistic
Team
The Chinese women's gymnastics team won the bronze medal but their medals were stripped ten years later, in 2010, due to Dong Fangxiao's age at the time of the competition. Their bronze medals were awarded to the United States' team.

Individual events

Hockey

Women's Team Competition
Team roster
Cai Xuemei
Chen Zhaoxia
Cheng Hui
Hou Xiaolan
Huang Junxia
Liu Lijie
Long Fengyu
Nie Yali
Shen Lihong
Tang Chunling
Wang Jiuyan
Yang Hongbing
Yang Huiping
Yu Yali
Zhou Wanfeng

Summary

Judo

Men

Women

Modern pentathlon

Rowing

Sailing

One man and three women competed for the People's Republic of China in the sailing competition at the 2000 Olympics, in three events.

Men's Mistral
 Zhou Yuanguo
 Race 1 –  (37) OCS
 Race 2 –  6
 Race 3 –  23
 Race 4 –  (37) DSQ
 Race 5 –  18
 Race 6 –  2
 Race 7 –  3
 Race 8 –  2
 Race 9 –  1
 Race 10 –  1
 Race 11 –  8
 Final –  64  (5th  place)

Women's Mistral
 Zhang Chujun
 Race 1 –  10
 Race 2 –  (17)
 Race 3 –  8
 Race 4 –  (11)
 Race 5 –  6
 Race 6 –  3
 Race 7 –  5
 Race 8 –  5
 Race 9 –  8
 Race 10 –  8
 Race 11 –  7
 Final –  60  (7th place)

Women's Double Handed Dinghy (470)
 Yang Xiaoyan and Li Dongying
 Race 1 –  (19)
 Race 2 –  14
 Race 3 –  (19)
 Race 4 –  18
 Race 5 –  11
 Race 6 –  16
 Race 7 –  18
 Race 8 –  18
 Race 9 –  16
 Race 10 –  17
 Race 11 –  12
 Final –  140  (19th place)

Shooting

Softball

Women's Team Competition
Team Roster
Wei Qiang
Tao Hua
Deng Xiaoling
Mu Xia
Xu Jian
Zhang Chunfang
Yan Fang
Wang Ying
An Zhongxin
Wang Lihong
Yu Yanhong
Zhou Yan
Qiu Haitao
Zhang Yanqing
Qin Xuejing

Swimming

Men

Women

Synchronized swimming

Table tennis

Men

Women

Taekwondo

Tennis

Triathlon

At the inaugural Olympic triathlon competition, China was represented by two women.

Volleyball

Women's
Team roster
Chen Jing
Gui Chaoran
He Qi
Li Shan
Li Yan
Qiu Aihua
Sun Yue
Wang Lina
Wu Dan
Wu Yongmei
Yin Yin
Zhu Yunying
Head coach: Hu Jin

Pool A Summary

Results

Quarterfinals

5–8th place classification semifinals

5/6th classification match

Weightlifting

Men

Women

Wrestling

Freestyle

Greco-Roman

See also
China at the Olympics
China at the 2000 Summer Paralympics

References

Additional Resources
Wallechinsky, David (2004). The Complete Book of the Summer Olympics (Athens 2004 Edition). Toronto, Canada. .
International Olympic Committee (2001). The Results. Retrieved 12 November 2005.
Sydney Organising Committee for the Olympic Games (2001). Official Report of the XXVII Olympiad Volume 1: Preparing for the Games. Retrieved 20 November 2005.
Sydney Organising Committee for the Olympic Games (2001). Official Report of the XXVII Olympiad Volume 2: Celebrating the Games. Retrieved 20 November 2005.
Sydney Organising Committee for the Olympic Games (2001). The Results. Retrieved 20 November 2005.
International Olympic Committee Web Site

Nations at the 2000 Summer Olympics
2000 Summer Olympics
Summer Olympics